The John Kabler House is a private house located at 415 Jackson Street in Petoskey, Michigan. It was placed on the National Register of Historic Places in 1986.

The John Kabler House is a -story bungalow with a front porch supported by piers. The building is clad with clapboard, and the eaves of the roof are exposed. The windows have vertical panes above single lights.

The house  was constructed in the 1920s, and is associated with John Kabler, who worked at the Northern Michigan Pulp Company.

References

Houses on the National Register of Historic Places in Michigan
Emmet County, Michigan